Endumeni Local Municipality is an administrative area in the Umzinyathi District of KwaZulu-Natal in South Africa. Endumeni is an isiZulu name meaning "a place of thunderstorm". The municipality shares its name with the Endumeni hill.

Main places
The 2001 census divided the municipality into the following main places:

Politics 

The municipal council consists of thirteen members elected by mixed-member proportional representation. Seven councillors are elected by first-past-the-post voting in seven wards, while the remaining six are chosen from party lists so that the total number of party representatives is proportional to the number of votes received.

In the election of 1 November 2021, the African National Congress (ANC) lost its majority, with both it and the Inkatha Freedom Party (IFP) winning five seats.

The following table shows the results of the election.

References

External links
 Official website

Local municipalities of the Umzinyathi District Municipality